The IBM ThinkPad 750 is a series of notebook computers from the ThinkPad series manufactured by IBM.

Features 
The 750 series included support for Cellular digital packet data. They also included the pop-up keyboard. The RAM could be expanded with an IC DRAM Card that contained ICs from Hitatchi.

Models 
750
750C
 750Cs
750P

Comparison

Reception 
A review of the 750C by the Los Angeles Times noted the excellent screen and the keyboard that be lifted up. It also noted the high price.

References

External links 
 Thinkwiki.de - 750

IBM laptops
ThinkPad